Thomas W. Merrill, a legal scholar, is the Charles Evans Hughes professor at Columbia Law School. He has also taught at Yale Law School and Northwestern University School of Law.

He is a leader in three fields: property, administrative, and environmental law. He received a B.A. from Grinnell College in 1971 and a B.A. with first-class honors in philosophy, politics and economics in 1973 from Oxford University, where he was a Rhodes Scholar.  He received his JD from the University of Chicago Law School in 1977 and went on to clerk for Judge David L. Bazelon of the D.C. Circuit Court of Appeals, and then United States Supreme Court Justice Harry A. Blackmun.  Before moving to Yale, he was the Charles Keller Beekman Professor of Law at Columbia from 2003 to 2008 and the John Paul Stevens Professor of Law at Northwestern University from 1993 to 2003.  He also served as a Deputy Solicitor General from 1987 to 1990. Merrill returned to Columbia in 2010.

Merrill has published dozens of articles in the country's most prestigious law reviews, including the Columbia Law Review, Harvard Law Review, and Yale Law Journal. He has co-authored multiple textbooks, generally dealing with the laws of property. In 2013, Merrill was awarded the Brigham-Kanner Property Rights Prize by the College of William and Mary School of Law for his extensive body of work concerning property rights.

See also 
 List of law clerks of the Supreme Court of the United States (Seat 2)

References

External links
Thomas W. Merrill at Columbia Law School

American Rhodes Scholars
Columbia Law School faculty
Grinnell College alumni
Law clerks of the Supreme Court of the United States
Living people
Northwestern University faculty
Scholars of constitutional law
University of Chicago Law School alumni
Yale Law School faculty
Year of birth missing (living people)